The Pawi was a German automobile manufactured by Paul Wilke only in 1921.  It had a 1598 cc four-cylinder engine, but enjoyed no commercial success.

References
David Burgess Wise, The New Illustrated Encyclopedia of Automobiles.

Defunct motor vehicle manufacturers of Germany